The Los Angeles Dodgers are a Major League Baseball team based in Los Angeles. The team is in the Western Division of the National League. Established in 1883, the team originated in Brooklyn, where it was known as the Brooklyn Dodgers, before moving to Los Angeles for the 1958 season.

A total of 55 players, managers, and executives in the National Baseball Hall of Fame and Museum, plus four broadcasters who have received the Hall's Ford C. Frick Award, spent some or part of their professional careers with the Los Angeles Dodgers

Hall of Famers

Key
* - Also served as a Dodger manager
** - Also served as a Dodger coach
*** - Also served as club president from 1925–29

Honored broadcasters
The Frick Award, according to the Hall, "is presented annually to a broadcaster for 'major contributions to baseball.' " The Hall explicitly states that Frick honorees are not members of the Hall.

See also
List of St. Louis Cardinals in the Baseball Hall of Fame
List of New York Yankees in the Baseball Hall of Fame

References

External links
Dodgers Hall of Famers
Baseball Reference

Hall of Fame
Dodgers